Paul Fitzsimmons Eve (June 27, 1806 – November 3, 1877) was an American surgeon and Confederate veteran.

Biography
Paul F. Eve was born in Richmond County, Georgia on June 27, 1806.

He graduated from Franklin College in 1826, and from the University of Pennsylvania Medical School in 1828. He participated in November Uprising.

He published over 600 articles in books and medical journals, and was the editor of the Southern Medical and Surgical Journal.

Eve died in Nashville on November 3, 1877.

References

1806 births
1877 deaths
University of Georgia alumni
Perelman School of Medicine at the University of Pennsylvania alumni
American surgeons
Confederate States Army officers
Presidents of the American Medical Association